The Innocent Man is a 2012 South Korean television series starring Song Joong-ki, Moon Chae-won, and Park Si-yeon. It is known on Netflix as Nice Guy.

It is a dark melodrama involving betrayal and romance. It aired on KBS2 for 20 episodes from September 12 to November 15, 2012.

Synopsis
Smart and promising medical student Kang Ma-ru (Song Joong-ki) is deeply in love with his slightly older neighbor Han Jae-hee (Park Si-yeon), a television reporter.  But when her situation takes a turn for the worse and Jae-hee becomes desperate to escape poverty, she meets a man who changes everything—a rich CEO who introduces her to a life of comfort. So she turns her back on Ma-ru, choosing money over love.

The brutal betrayal leaves Ma-ru fractured—not just angry, but a completely changed man. A few years later, Ma-ru is now 30 years old and works as a bartender and gigolo, no longer a "nice guy." He then meets Seo Eun-gi (Moon Chae-won), a young chaebol heiress who's being groomed to take over her father's conglomerate. Eun-gi is cold and calculating, business-savvy, and raised by her father to never show emotion to anyone.

Ma-ru decides to take revenge on his ex Jae-hee and bring her down from her position after his sister, Kang Cho-co (Lee Yu-bi) is rushed to the hospital because of Jae-hee. Ma-ru, though initially had no plans as such, uses Eun-gi to take revenge on Jae-hee Just when Ma-ru is beginning to love Eun-gi, she finds out the real reason why he approached her and they break up. But a car accident causes Eun-gi to lose her memory, and she enters Ma-ru's life again.

Cast

Main
Song Joong-ki as Kang Ma-ru
Kang Chan-hee as young Ma-ru
A smart but poor medical student who has to look after his little sister without any parents. He was in love Jae-hee but she left him for a rich CEO as she always dreamt of being rich, but she always loved Ma-ru and still harbours feelings for him. Six years after Jae-hee left he became arrogant and a playboy who works as a bartender. He approached Eun-gi as part of his revenge plan against Jae-hee but he started to care for her and eventually fell in love.
Moon Chae-won as Seo Eun-gi
A rich and arrogant girl but also has a kind-hearted side who does everything to protect her mother's memories who has a troubled relationship with her father and step-mother as she blames them for her mother leaving and her death. She falls for Ma-ru without knowing the real reason he approached her and she suffers a memory loss after landing in a car accident. After her memory loss, she is a much nicer person who searches for clues in order to get her memory returned.
Park Si-yeon as Han Jae-hee
Park So-young as young Jae-hee
Although she is stone-hearted and loves Ma-ru, she loved money more than Ma-Ru and she left Ma-ru and became the mistress of CEO and had his son. Although, her and Eun-gi don’t get along and she also dont care for her and tried to hurt her in many ways. She plans to take over Taesan Company after killing her husband.

Supporting
Lee Kwang-soo as Park Jae-gil
Ma-ru's best friend and Choco's lover.
Lee Yu-bi as Kang Choco
Han Seo-jin as young Kang Choco 
Ma-ru's younger sister and Jae-gil's lover.
Lee Sang-yeob as Park Joon-ha
Eun-gi's secretary and helper who loved and respected her.
Kim Tae-hoon as Ahn Min-young
The secretary of the CEO who likes Jae-hee. 
Yang Ik-june as Han Jae-sik
Jae-hee's older brother who was abusive towards her. 
Kim Yeong-cheol as CEO Seo Jung-gyu
Eun-gi and Eun-seok's father, who found Jae-hee and took her as his mistress. Although good hearted, he sides with Jae-hee rather than his daughter as Eun-gi is stubborn and acts childish at times. He dies later in the season and gives his property and estate to Eun-gi but before she could be in charge, she lands in a car accident and suffers a memory loss.
Jin Kyung as Hyun Jung-hwa
Eun-gi's assistant. After the car accident which caused Eun-gi’s memory loss, she took her away and cared for her for a year where nobody could find her.
Oh Yong as Jo Young-bae
Jo Hwi-joon as Seo Eun-seok
Jae-hee and Jung-gyu's son, Eun-gi's 4 year old half-brother. He loves his step-sister despite her rudeness and hatred toward him but after her memory loss, she is unable to remember her hatred for him and instead grows closer to him.
Kim Ye-won as Kim Yoo-ra
Oh Hee-joon as Han Jae-shik
Jo Sung-ha as Dr. Seok Min-hyuk (cameo, ep 1, 12, 20)
Danny Ahn as Kim Jung-hoon (cameo, ep 2 & 15)

Production
The series is written by Lee Kyung-hee, who previously wrote Will It Snow for Christmas?, Thank You, A Love to Kill, I'm Sorry, I Love You, and Sang Doo! Let's Go to School.

Kim Jin-won was the director of Drama Special episodes Just an Ordinary Love Story, Crossing the Young-do Bridge, Guardian Angel Kim Yeong-goo, Snail Gosiwon, and The Last Flashman.

The series features real-life friends and former Running Man co-stars Song Joong-ki and Lee Kwang-soo for the first time since Song left the variety show.

Soundtrack

Part 1
 사랑은 눈꽃처럼 (Love Is Like a Snowflake) - Junsu 
 착한 여자 (Nice Girl) - Lee Soo-young 
 좋은 사람입니다 (No One Is Better Than You) - Cho Eun
 Lonely
 Jae-hee and Ma-ru (with Empty Heart & Change)
 Bueno Hombre
 Waltz in Sorrow
 Eun-gi and Ma-ru (with Late Autumn)
 Melancholy
 Blue Moon
 Eun-gi (with Magnolia)
 Late Autumn
 Empty Heart
 Broken Heart
 Water Lily
 Magnolia

Part 2
 정말 (Really) - Song Joong-ki
 너만을 원했다 (I Only Wanted You) - Son Hoyoung (narration by Song Joong-ki)
 사랑해요 (I Love You) - Yoon Bitnara
 Change
 Here to Stay
 차칸남자 (Complicación)
 Waltz in Sorrow (Guitar)
 Beautiful Love
 Nobody Sees Me
 Despedida
 Laberinto
 Lonely Street
 Collision De Frente
 Before Winter Comes

Ratings
Beginning episode 5, the series ranked number one in its timeslot for eight consecutive weeks until its finale.

Awards and nominations

References

External links
  
 
 
 

2012 South Korean television series debuts
2012 South Korean television series endings
Korean Broadcasting System television dramas
Korean-language television shows
Television series about revenge
Television shows written by Lee Kyung-hee
South Korean romance television series
South Korean melodrama television series
Television series by IHQ (company)